The European Tour 2015/2016 – Event 2 (also known as the 2015 Paul Hunter Classic) was a professional minor-ranking snooker tournament that took place between 26 and 30 August 2015 in Fürth, Germany.

Mark Allen was the defending champion, but he lost 3–4 to Sanderson Lam in the round of 128.

Ali Carter won his seventh professional title, beating Shaun Murphy 4–3 in the final.

Prize fund
The breakdown of prize money of the event is shown below:

Main draw

Preliminary rounds

Round 1
Best of 7 frames

Round 2
Best of 7 frames

Round 3 
Best of 7 frames

Main rounds

Top half

Section 1

Section 2

Section 3

Section 4

Bottom half

Section 5

Section 6

Section 7

Section 8

Finals

Century breaks 

 142  Dechawat Poomjaeng
 140  Liang Wenbo
 136  Michael Williams
 131  Kurt Maflin
 130, 106, 102  Judd Trump
 130  Stuart Carrington
 129, 111  Ashley Carty
 128  Peter Ebdon
 126  Josh Boileau
 125, 110  John Higgins
 125  Ashley Hugill
 124  Brian Cini
 123, 123  Mark King
 123  Shaun Murphy

 122  Kyren Wilson
 117, 115  David Gilbert
 114  Jamie Cope
 112, 105  Ali Carter
 110  Elliot Slessor
 110  Chris Norbury
 108, 107  Patrick Einsle
 105  Ben Woollaston
 105  Rod Lawler
 105  Mark Williams
 103  Ian Burns
 102  Dominic Dale
 100  Sean O'Sullivan

References

2015
ET2
2015 in German sport